Miss Universe Japan 2017, the Miss Universe Japan pageant, took place in the Hotel Chinzanso Tokyo, Bunkyō, Tokyo, Japan, on July 4, 2017. Sari Nakazawa of Shiga crowned Momoko Abe of Chiba at the end of the event. The winner represented Japan during Miss Universe 2017.

Contestants 
47 contestants competed:

References

External links
 Miss Universe Japan Official website

2017 beauty pageants
Beauty pageants in Japan